This is a list of Kikoriki episodes that have been broadcast in the United Kingdom. A total of 208 6-minute episodes have been broadcast in Russia.

Series overview

Episodes

Season 1 (2008–09)

Season 2 (2010–12)

Series 1 on Kids Central (May 6, 2006 - September 26, 2009)

Series 2 on Kids Central (September 19 - December 31, 2011, February 5, 2007 - December 31, 2013)

External links
 

Kikoriki
Kikoriki